Thorleif Lintrup Paus (6 January 1912 – 28 November 2006) was a Norwegian lawyer and diplomat.

Born at Rjukan, he finished law school in 1937 and worked as a judge before joining the diplomatic service after World War II. He was a bureau chief at the Foreign Ministry, first secretary at the embassy in Washington D.C. and the mission in Bern, counselor at the embassy in London, counselor at the embassy in Rome and, from 1962, consul general in Singapore.

In 1965, the King appointed him ambassador to Iran and, in 1969, the ambassador to Brazil. Finally, he was ambassador to Mexico until retiring in 1980.

Honours
Commander of the Royal Norwegian Order of St. Olav (1972)

References

1912 births
2006 deaths
Ambassadors of Norway to Iran
Ambassadors of Norway to Mexico
Ambassadors of Norway to Brazil
Norwegian judges
People from Rjukan
Thorleif
Place of death missing